Imam Abdulrahman Bin Faisal University (IAU), formerly known as the University of Dammam (UoD), is a university in Dammam, Saudi Arabia. It is one of the oldest universities in the Eastern Province of Saudi Arabia. It is one of the leading universities in medicine for both male and female students. After its separation from King Faisal University, it is now thriving to become one of the best universities in the Kingdom.

Dr. Abdullah Al-Rubaish is its President. It was a previously a part of King Faisal University (now in Al-hasa only).

The new name is Imam Abdulrahman Bin Faisal University, it has been renamed during the visit of King Salman bin Abdelaziz to Dammam November 2016.

The main campus is in the coastal area of Al-Rakah (situated between Dammam and Khobar). Several colleges are scattered around the eastern province (College of Medicine is in the main campus.)

The admissions to this university is based on standardized national exams. Afterwards, students are admitted into tracks based on their grades. In their first year, students compete for majors where the top students are sorted into the colleges of their choice. The medical track is one of the most competitive in the entire university. For example, only the top 140 students would be admitted into the college of medicine, and so on.

In May 2021, Dr. Ebtisam Mohammed Al-Mathal, who is the dean of human resources and a professor of parasitology in the science faculty, was appointed secretary of the board of trustees at the university.

History
The University of Dammam was founded 1975 with two colleges - the College of Medicine and the College of Architecture. Both male and female students have been enrolled at the University since its inception.

Other colleges followed: Applied Medical Sciences (1995), Dentistry (2001), Applied Studies and Community Services (2003) and Nursing.

University Colleges

References

External links
 

1975 establishments in Saudi Arabia
Educational institutions established in 1975